Al-Azhar Park is a public park located in qism al-Darb al-Ahmar, in Historic Cairo, Egypt.

Among several honors, this park is listed as one of the world's sixty great public spaces by the Project for Public Spaces. The park was created by the Historic Cities Support Programme of the Aga Khan Trust for Culture, an entity of the Aga Khan Development Network. The park was developed at a cost in excess of USD $30 million, its funding a grant to Cairo from Aga Khan IV, a descendant of the Fatimid Caliphs of Cairo. 

The park project, an urbanism initiative, included: 
 the development of the park
 archeology involving a 12th-century Ayyubid wall
 historic building rehabilitation (the 14th Century Umm Sultan Shaban Mosque, the 13th century Khayrbek complex, and the Darb Shoughlan School)
 several quality of life improvement initiatives requiring skills training, area rehabilitation, microfinance, and support in the areas of health and education, among others.

The gardens of al-Azhar Park
In 1984, Aga Khan IV was visiting Cairo on a conference. From his hotel balcony; Al-Darassa hill  was visible: mounts of wreckage and ruins amassed during 500 years. He decided to intervene and offer that medieval area via the Historic Cities Support Programme the much-needed gift of an oasis in this urban desert. The sum of 30 million dollars was allocated to the project and put in the qualified hand of a local architecture and urbanism office: Sites International.
The site posed several technical challenges; half a millennium of debris was at hand. Works of excavation, grading and replacement with appropriate fill began in 1992. 
"Over 765,000 m3 was taken out of the Park and 160,000 m3 was used as fill elsewhere on site. A further 605,000 m3 was subjected to geotechnical treatment (sieving, washing, etc.) and mixed with 60,000 m3 of special sand and topsoil to enable the site to be covered with a layer of “good” soil from 0.5 to 2.0 meters deep. A total of 1.5 million cubic meters of rubble and soil were moved, which represents over 80,000 truckloads."
While the designers grappled with the technical difficulties at hand posed by the terrain and soil the government introduces an additional unexpected constraint at halfway through the process: three cisterns were to be integrated into the terrain to improve the supply of potable water to the city of Cairo. Works had to be interrupted and the design revised to integrate the new three elements.
The new revised layout of the park was then carefully designed according to the landscape of the hill and the new 3 water tanks. It is mainly divided in five sections according to slope inclination, leaving us with: 2 hills (southern and northern), a rolling topography hill to the east, a flat area north and a western steep slope.

The designers insisted on integrating traditional Islamic landscape traditions in both their design and choice of greenery, thus allowing the past flow of the city to come back to life. Tradition and historical legacy were preserved:
This legacy can be seen in a variety of styles from different periods and different regions. It is reflected in the bustan-like orchard spaces, the shaded sitting areas (takhtaboush) and the Fatimid archways used in the construction of Park buildings, among other elements. Persian and Timurid elements are also reflected in the water channels and fountains.
The Nile, symbol of Egypt and Cairo, also finds a place in the new project as the river is designed to feed the water ponds in the park. The choice of plantation was also carefully made, according to landscape and quality of soil. Several tests were done at the American University in Cairo that offered its nursery for propagating the flora of the park to make sure that the adequate choices for the climate were being made. 
Opened to the public in 2005, the gardens of al-Azhar are reminiscent of historical Islamic gardens, with a blend of modern and traditional elements.  The central terraced formal gardens, emphatic use of fountains, Mamluk multicolored stonework, sunken gardens, intersecting waterways and bold Islamic geometry are all integrated into a contemporary site design; cafes are situated at the entrance, playgrounds and scenic overlooks are arranged along curving paths.  The site is supported by a reservoir constructed for the project.

Restoration of the Ayyubid Wall

While the excavation was still ongoing, under the mounts of garbage a treasure was uncovered: a wall to a depth of 15 meters and a 1.5 kilometers section. The forgotten historic Ayyubid Wall and towers were revealed in their entire splendor. It quickly became evident that the new uncovered gem was inseparable from the park project. Buried during centuries, the stone wall presented different forms of deterioration such as flaking and disaggregation. 
"[The] segment of wall constitutes a uniform piece of construction. It comprises a few repeating elements, such as round-fronted towers and curtain walls, and is consistent in its use of materials. […] The walls are adorned and punctuated by crenellations, arrow slits, stairwells and chambers." Among the structures uncovered and restored were two former eastern city gates: Bab al-Barqiyya and Bab al-Mahruq.

Revitalization of Darb-Al-Ahmar
The uncovering of the Ayyubid wall shed the light on the neighboring area of Darb al-Ahmar. The population of the area, one of the poorest in Cairo, was lacking adequate sanitation and rubbish-collection services due to their adjacent location to the old city dumpster. But that was just the problem at the surface; Darb al-Ahmar was suffering from deficits and troubles on several levels. Lack of education, sanitation, and hygiene, insalubrious living conditions and extreme poverty were some of the deeper problems. With the new improvement brought to the area by the park, the neighborhood of Darb al-Ahmar was now in the prominent danger of gentrification causing the dislocation of its inhabitants by new luxury projects. The area also comprised over 60 historical monuments under great distress. 
As the AKDC foundation lacked funding to encompass this new chapter of the project, the Agha Khan proved once again of agility and commitment to his promise. New foundations providing supplemental funding (such as Egyptian-Swiss Development Fund and Ford Foundation) were approached to start an invigoration program of the area of Darb al-Ahmar and continue the flux of the program. 
The rehabilitation program affected the area on two levels: On one hand the physical aspect, accordingly endangered historical monuments were rehabilitated and restored:
"We rebuilt the minaret of the mosque and madrasa of Umm al-Sultan Shaaban based on research and studies on the previous minaret, which collapsed during an earthquake. We rebuilt it in order to show people what it looked like, in order to re-create the past, which might be lost forever otherwise. [...] We not only restore monuments, but we also aim to make them functional and beneficial for the users."
The project started mainly with three buildings: Khayerbek Complex (Mamluk and Ottoman monument), the Darb Shoghlan School restored to be used as the headquarters for the community development company and Umm Al-Sultan Shaaban Complex. Later it extended to encompass more buildings and public spaces.

On another hand, the non-physical aspect, a more sustainable project affecting the residents was also introduced to induce socio-economic growth. Firstly, although the area is populated with one of the poorest inhabitants of Cairo community and family life remained strong. Small family businesses, including carpentry, tile making, and other small crafts, continued to provide a portion of the local population with a living. Those resources were utilized and amplified by the program introduced: training workshops were offered and some long lost crafts were re-introduced (such as arabesque wood carving techniques). The project also generated many working opportunities for instance the ayyubid wall restoration project was transformed into a mass employment opportunities as all the working force was hired from Darb al-Ahmar and special training workshops were provided. The Carpentry skills were also utilized to produce furniture for the Al-Azhar park. The community as a whole was also involved in the preservation and maintenance of the park. Other apprenticeships were also arranged in the fields of computers, mobile phone services, automobile electronics, office skills and tourist market goods. And finally to complete the socio-economic development long term, micro-credits have been offered to more than 400 individuals to help evolve their businesses. The several programs were also offered to women, in fact in 2008 from the 159 individuals that attended the training session 59% were women. The initiative of empowering women is a very innovative and positive aspect of this project. In fact, the impact of the Al-Azhar Park project will most certainly fulfill some of the Millennium Development Goals (MDGs) set forth by the UN at the start of the 21st century.
"the integrated project [realized] three of the MDGs: […] the eradication of extreme poverty through the extension of micro-credit and employment generation; ensuring environmental sustainability through the rehabilitation, and raising the awareness, of cultural and natural assets; and finally, the promotion of global/local partnerships and networks by pooling the resources of contributors."

Urban Plaza and Museum of Historic Cairo

At the Northern end of the park, an "Urban Plaza" project is under development which will house the Museum of Historic Cairo. The Urban Plaza will be a mixed-use centre with underground car parking, shops and cultural facilities. It is being built by the Aga Khan Trust for Culture in cooperation with the Supreme Council of Antiquities of Egypt.

The Museum will describe the evolution of Egypt's capital city Cairo, and house some of the great wealth of art and artifacts of the city's Islamic heritage that are not currently on display. With 4,000 square metres of exhibition space spread over two floors, the museum is expected to have 1,000 pieces on display from different historical periods. It will provide visitors insight into the urban, cultural and architectural history of the heart of Cairo.

To conserve and restore all the artefacts and artworks which will be shown in the museum, the Trust has set up a major conservation laboratory, which is training young technicians in this field. It is also being used to restore important art and architectural elements for the Cairo Museum of Islamic Art.

Awards and recognition
 Al-Azhar Park is listed among the 60 of the World's Great Places by Project for Public Spaces
 2005 Travel +Leisure magazine Global Vision Innovation Award

Photos

See also
 Historic Cities Support Programme
 Aga Khan Trust for Culture
 Aga Khan Development Network
 Darb al-Ahmar
 Bab al-Barqiyya

References

Sources

External links
 Historic Cities Support Programme
 Project Page - AKTC Historic Cities Support Programme — Cairo / Al-Azhar Park
 The Aga Khan Trust for Culture
 The Aga Khan Development Network
 The Al-Azhar Park
 Listing in 60 of the World's Great Places

Parks in Egypt
Geography of Cairo
Tourist attractions in Cairo
2005 establishments in Egypt
Archaeological sites in Egypt
Aga Khan Trust for Culture projects
Medieval Cairo
Protected areas established in 2005